In common law and civil law, a rebuttable presumption (in Latin, praesumptio iuris tantum) is an assumption made by a court that is taken to be true unless someone proves otherwise. For example, a defendant in a criminal case is presumed innocent until proven guilty. It is often associated with prima facie evidence.

Criminal law
Rebuttable presumptions in criminal law are somewhat controversial in that they do effectively reverse the presumption of innocence in some cases. For example, in England and Wales, section 75 of the Sexual Offences Act 2003 makes several rebuttable presumptions about mens rea and consent to sexual activity.

In some cases, a rebuttable presumption can also work in favor of the accused. For instance, in Australia, there is a rebuttable presumption that a child aged at least 10 but less than 14 is incapable of committing a criminal act.

Civil law
An example from civil law is a rebuttable presumption for shared parenting after divorce, where the default is that child spends equal amounts of parenting time with their mother and father, with exceptions for child abuse and neglect. Such a law was enacted in the US State of Kentucky in 2018. Such presumptions also exist in California real estate law where title ownership of real estate may be rebutted only by clear and convincing evidence of a claim of ownership. Tennessee applies the rule of sevens, where it is rebuttably presumed that any minor aged 7–13 is not mature enough to consent to medical procedures, while minors aged 14 and older are.

See also 

 Legal burden of proof
 Conclusive (irrebuttable) presumption
 Presumption
 Prima facie

References

Evidence law
English law